Berlin-Schlachtensee (in German Bahnhof Berlin-Schlachtensee) is a railway station in the Schlachtensee quarter in the district Steglitz-Zehlendorf of Berlin, Germany. It is served by the Berlin S-Bahn.

The station is south of the lake Schlachtensee and was opened in 1874. The service was temporarily suspended because of the low use because of the S-Bahn-Boykott during the Cold War, to demonstrate against the GDR who also operated the S-Bahn in the west of berlin, despite the wall. In 1970, the tracks were dismantled. It was not until 1985 that operations could be resumed.

References

External links
Station information 

Railway stations in Berlin
Berlin S-Bahn stations
Buildings and structures in Steglitz-Zehlendorf
Railway stations in Germany opened in 1874